Edward Pierrepont Beckwith was the son of Leonard Forbes 
and Margaretta Willoughby Pierrepont Beckwith and was born in New York April 27, 1877.

Beckwith graduated from Massachusetts Institute of Technology in 1901. He
worked for General Electric, conducting some of the first experiments with tungsten as a
filament for electric lamps.  Additional experimentation included working on the purification of water, iron oxydation, and the use of mercury in silica tubes.

Beckwith was an avid mountaineer and climbed the Swiss Alps and the Austrian Dolomites soon after graduation from university. He was elected a member of The Explorers Club in New York in 1930.  After he retired, he participated as an observer, navigator, and photographer on scientific expeditions,
including the Carnegie Institute's Mount McKinley Cosmic Ray Expedition in 1932, the Rainbow
Bridge-Monument Valley Expedition of 1937 (which mapped 2000 square miles in southern Utah and
northern Arizona), and the 1939-40 Fairchild Tropical Expedition in the Philippines and the Dutch East
Indies aboard Cheng Ho.

Beckwith appeared in Who's Who of Engineering in 1922.

Beckwith died on July 5, 1966 at the age of 89 died of a heart attack while driving his car alone.

References

Massachusetts Institute of Technology alumni
1877 births
1966 deaths
Place of death missing